Springer Mountain is a mountain located in the Chattahoochee National Forest on the border of Fannin and Gilmer counties. Springer Mountain serves as the southern terminus for the Appalachian and Benton MacKaye trails.

Name
The origin of the name of Springer Mountain is unclear. One possible origin was that it was named in honor of William G. Springer, an early settler appointed in 1833 by Governor Wilson Lumpkin to implement legislation to improve conditions for the Indians. Another possibility was that Springer Mountain was named for the first Presbyterian minister to be ordained in Georgia, John Springer, who was ordained in 1790.

The mountain has been called Springer since at least 1910. As late as 1959, some residents of Gilmer County were still calling the peak Penitentiary Mountain. According to the Gilmer County Historical Society, the name was officially changed by the Georgia Appalachian Trail Club (GATC). It is unknown why the mountain was named Penitentiary. There is no known Cherokee name for the mountain.

Geography
Springer Mountain is a north–south-trending loaf-shaped mountain located on the border of Gilmer and Fannin counties. Springer Mountain is part of the Blue Ridge Mountains that extend from Georgia to Pennsylvania. Springer Mountain divides the northern and southern extensions of the Blue Ridge in Georgia, with one branch heading northwest to the Cohutta Mountains and the other branch heading southwest to Mount Oglethorpe. Springer Mountain is located inside the Chattahoochee National Forest, as well as the Ed Jenkins National Recreation Area.

Other nearby geographical features include Black Mountain, Tickanetley Creek and Winding Stair Gap.

Hiking

Appalachian Trail

In 1958, the southern terminus of the Appalachian Trail was relocated from Mount Oglethorpe to Springer Mountain. The reason for this relocation was because of increased development around Mount Oglethorpe. Springer Mountain was considered to be less dramatic than Mount Oglethorpe, but because of its remoteness, Springer Mountain was also considered to be less susceptible to development.

At the peak of Springer Mountain is a bronze plaque with the Appalachian Trail logo, a register for hikers to sign, and a benchmark.

In addition to the Appalachian Trail, Springer Mountain can be reached from the south via the Appalachian Approach Trail.

Benton MacKaye Trail
Springer Mountain is also home to the southern terminus of the Benton MacKaye Trail.

Shelters
A water spring is located near this shelter.

Gallery

See also

List of mountain peaks of North America
List of mountain peaks of the United States
List of U.S. states by elevation
List of mountains in Georgia (U.S. state)
List of peaks on Appalachian Trail in Georgia

References

External links

 Georgia AT club
 Springer Mountain Hiking & Backpacking Trails
 TopoQuest Map of Springer Mountain
 

Mountains of Fannin County, Georgia
Mountains of Gilmer County, Georgia
Mountains of Georgia (U.S. state)
Mountains on the Appalachian Trail
Chattahoochee-Oconee National Forest